Kenneth Harman (born 1947) is a male British former sports shooter.

Sports shooting career
Harman competed in the 1988 Summer Olympics.

He represented England and won a gold medal in the skeet pairs with Joe Neville, at the 1986 Commonwealth Games in Edinburgh, Scotland. Four years later he represented England and won another gold medal in the individual skeet and a silver medal in the skeet pairs with Andy Austin, at the 1990 Commonwealth Games in Auckland, New Zealand. A third appearance arrived at the 1994 Commonwealth Games when he competed in the skeet and skeet pairs with Andy Austin.

References

1947 births
Living people
British male sport shooters
Olympic shooters of Great Britain
Shooters at the 1988 Summer Olympics
Shooters at the 1986 Commonwealth Games
Shooters at the 1990 Commonwealth Games
Shooters at the 1994 Commonwealth Games
Commonwealth Games medallists in shooting
Commonwealth Games gold medallists for England
Commonwealth Games silver medallists for England
20th-century British people
Medallists at the 1986 Commonwealth Games
Medallists at the 1990 Commonwealth Games